Kraszewo  is a village in the administrative district of Gmina Iłowo-Osada, within Działdowo County, Warmian-Masurian Voivodeship, in northern Poland.

The village has a population of 160.

References

Villages in Działdowo County